Timeline of the History of Assam, the important dates in its history against important events elsewhere.

Notes

References

 
 
 
 
 
 

A